Tatran Handball Arena, is an indoor sporting arena located in Prešov, Slovakia.  The seating capacity of the arena is for 3,870 people. It is currently home to HT Tatran Prešov. The hall is mainly used for handball, although it is suitable for numerous other sporting competitions and various concerts, exhibitions, fairs, conventions, and congresses.

Indoor arenas in Slovakia
Buildings and structures in Prešov
HT Tatran Prešov
Handball venues in Slovakia